Auckland University of Technology ( AUT) is a university in New Zealand, formed on 1 January 2000 when a former technical college (originally established in 1895) was granted university status. AUT is New Zealand's third largest university in terms of total student enrolment, with approximately 29,100 students enrolled across three campuses in Auckland. It has five faculties, and an additional three specialist locations: AUT Millennium, Warkworth Radio Astronomical Observatory and AUT Centre for Refugee Education.

AUT enrolled more than 29,000 students in 2018, including 4,194 international students from 94 countries and 2,417 postgraduate students. AUT's student population is diverse with a range of ethnic backgrounds including New Zealand European, Asian, Māori and Pasifika. Students also represent a wide age range with 22% being aged 25–39 years and 10% being 40 or older.

AUT employed 2,474 full-time equivalent (FTE) staff in 2016, including both professional and academic.

Data suggests that 86% of AUT's graduates are employed full-time within nine months of graduating. In the 2019 World University Rankings, AUT was ranked as 301–350.

History
AUT was founded as Auckland Technical School in 1895, offering evening classes only. Daytime classes began in 1906 and its name was changed to Auckland Technical College. In 1913 it was renamed Seddon Memorial Technical College. In the early 1960s educational reforms resulted in the separation of secondary and tertiary teaching; two educational establishments were formed; the tertiary (polytechnic) adopting the name Auckland Technical Institute (ATI) in 1963 and the secondary school continuing with the same name. For three years they co-existed on the same site, but by 1964 the secondary school had moved to a new site in Western Springs and eventually became Western Springs College. In 1989 ATI became Auckland Institute of Technology (AIT), and the current name was adopted when university status was granted in 2000.

Sir Paul Reeves served as university chancellor from 2005 until his death in 2011.

In July 2019, controversy arose when AUT cancelled an event commemorating the Tiananmen Square massacre, and allegations arose that this was due to interference from the Government of China, due to contact between Chinese officials and the university. AUT denied that China had pressured them, although this claim has been heavily disputed, including by some university staff.

In late October 2022, Stuff reported that AUT was intending to lay off 250 full-time staff including 170 academic staff and 80 professional staff. Earlier, AUT had announced plans to lay off 230 staff members in early September 2022. The university's Vice-Chancellor Damon Salesa attributed the redundancies to rising salary costs, declining government funding, and a projected decline in the number of student enrollments for 2023. In response, the Tertiary Education Union (TEU) announced that it would take legal action against AUT in an attempt to halt the 170 staff job redundancies. In early January 2023, the Employment Relations Authority (ERA) ordered AUT to scrap the 170 planned redundancies it had issued to TEU members. ERA also ruled that the university had violated its collective employment agreement with staff when it issued its severance notices in early December 2022.

Campuses and facilities
AUT has three campuses: City (in Auckland CBD), North and South, and the training institute, Millennium. City and North campuses offer student accommodation. AUT runs a shuttle bus service between the three campuses.

City campus

City Campus spreads over several sites in the heart of central Auckland. The largest site is situated on Wellesley Street East and is home to most of the academic units and central administration, including the Vice-Chancellor's Office and research centres. The Faculties of Business, Economics and Law, Design and Creative Technologies, Culture and Society and Te Ara Poutama share this location.

Facilities of the campus include an early childhood centre, International Student Centre, printing centre, gym, Chinese Centre, Pasifika Student Support Service, Postgraduate Centre and Te Tari Āwhina Learning Development Centre. The Central Library holds over 245,000 books and journals on four floors. There are cafes, restaurants and bars, including the student-owned Vesbar. Training restaurants Piko Restaurant and Four Seasons Restaurant have operated commercially since 2011. There is also a marae, the AUT Shop, St Paul St Art Gallery, a university bookshop, and the Wellesley student apartments.

AUT has recently completed a number of buildings, including the new WZ building designed to house the engineering, computer science and mathematics students under one roof. The first 8 levels of the 12-storey $120 million building opened in July 2018 to coincide with the start of the second academic semester. The building itself was designed to be a teaching tool, with structural components visible, ceilings left exposed for viewing and the building management systems being visible on screens for analysis by students. Sustainability was also a goal, with rain water being collected for use in the labs, occupancy sensors in the rooms to ensure that areas are not being unnecessarily lit and solar fins on the outside of the building to regulate heat from the sun and ease load on the air-conditioning system.

Another recent building completion is the $98 million WG precinct. Named after the former Chancellor of the university, the Sir Paul Reeves Building hosts the School of Communication Studies. The 12-storey building was officially opened by Prime Minister John Key on 22 March 2013. It provides an additional learning space of about 20,000 square metres that consists of convention spaces, screen and television studios and a motion capture, sound and performance studio.

South campus

AUT opened South Campus (formerly Manukau Campus) in 2010, creating the first university campus based in the region. It offers undergraduate and postgraduate degrees in business, computer and information sciences, education, health sciences, year 1 of law, as well as sports management and science. South Campus hosts its own library, student lounges, student information centre, course information centre, computer labs, wireless network, and café. The campus also boasts astro turf courts with tennis, basketball, netball, volleyball, touch, and soccer equipment available for hire.

In 2016, the university invested significantly in the construction of the Mana Hauora (MH) Building. Construction of MH was completed in December 2016, and was officially opened by Prime Minister Bill English in March 2017. As the largest building on campus, MH is now the new heart of the campus and incorporates a number of sustainability design features. In 2017, three awards were given in recognition of the new MH Building at the New Zealand Institute of Architects (NZIA) Auckland Regional Awards.

North campus
North Campus is located on Akoranga Drive in Northcote. The Faculty of Health and Environmental Sciences (including the Sport and Recreation division) and School of Education share this campus, which has park-like grounds. AUT's main sport and fitness centre is located at the campus, encompassing a gymnasium, weights room, testing equipment, golf swing clinic, and indoor courts. The campus also offers a library, student services centre, early childhood centre, AuSM branch, PrintSprint shop, health counselling and wellbeing centre, university bookshop, and food outlets. In addition, the campus provides five health clinics (oral, physiotherapy, podiatry, psychotherapy, and ultrasound), which are now located at the NorthMed Health Clinic building at 3 Akoranga Drive, Northcote (since July 2017). North Campus is closely linked with the nearby AUT Millennium Institute of Sport and Health.

AUT Millennium
Like AUT North Campus, the Millennium Institute is located on Auckland's North Shore, at Mairangi Bay. AUT Millennium provides sports training, and hosts national and local sports organisations, including Swimming New Zealand, New Zealand Water Polo, Northsport Olympic Weightlifting, and Sport and Recreation New Zealand. The institute has training facilities, athlete accommodation, sports science laboratories, an aquatics facility, and a commercial gym.

Warkworth Radio Astronomical Observatory
AUT maintains a number of facilities off campus, including the AUT Radio Telescope, New Zealand's first radio telescope. The 12m telescope is located near Warkworth and is part of New Zealand's and Australia's involvement in the international mega-science project, the Square Kilometre Array. The AUT/New Zealand Alliance won the 'Highly Commended' award in the Innovation Excellence in Research category at the 2016 New Zealand Innovation Awards.

AUT Centre for Refugee Education 
AUT's Centre for Refugee Education, located in Mangere, provides an on-arrival six-week education programme for the 1,000 refugees who come to New Zealand each year under the government quota scheme. The education programme teaches English language skills at early childhood, primary, secondary and adult levels, as well as orientation to life in New Zealand. With a new set of learners arriving every two months, and with ages ranging from early childhood to adult, the teaching team has developed a curriculum that gives refugees English and life skills, but remains flexible in order to tailor the lessons to each new intake.

Faculties
AUT has five faculties. These are:
 Culture and Society
 Business, Economics and Law
 Design and Creative Technologies
 Health and Environmental Sciences
 Te Ara Poutama
AUT has 16 schools that sit within these faculties. These are:

 Art and Design 
 Business 
 Clinical Sciences
 Communication Studies 
 Economics
 Education 
 Engineering, Computer and Mathematical Sciences 
 Future Environments (also contains the former Colab: Creative Technologies)
 Hospitality and Tourism 
 Language and Culture 
 Law 
 Public Health and Interdisciplinary Studies
 Science
 Social Sciences and Public Policy 
 Sport and Recreation 
 Te Ara Poutama – Māori and Indigenous Development

Programmes
AUT offers undergraduate and postgraduate (both doctoral and Master) degrees, as well as sub-degree qualifications such as diplomas and certificates. Programmes are offered in the areas/fields of applied sciences, art and design, business, business information systems, communication studies, computer and information sciences, education, engineering, health care practice, hospitality and tourism, languages, law, mathematical science, midwifery, nursing, occupational therapy, oral health, paramedicine and emergency management, Māori development, physiotherapy, podiatry, psychology, psychotherapy, public health, rehabilitation and occupation studies, social science, and sport and recreation.

The AUT Business School has been recognised as one of the top business schools in the world by the Association to Advance Collegiate Schools of Business (AACSB) International.

Research centres
As a relatively new university, AUT came in eighth place in the 2006 Performance-Based Research Fund (PBRF) round, but has shown the greatest improvement in PBRF rating of New Zealand's eight universities.

Research partnerships and exchanges have been established with some of the world's leading universities. AUT's growing research profile has seen an increase in research programme enrolments and external funding, as well as research institutions.

The university opened new research centres and institutes in 2016, bringing the total number to more than 60, covering a wide range of disciplines. In 2016, AUT's quality-assured research outputs increased by 9% to more than 2000 outputs, including publication in leading international journals.

New Zealand Tourism Research Institute
The New Zealand Tourism Research Institute (NZTRI), brings together local and international experts in tourism and hospitality. It was established in 1999 by Professor Simon Milne, and is located in the School of Hospitality and Tourism. In 2010 the institute brought together 19 researchers as well as 15 PhD students, several other graduate students being linked to the Institute in more informal ways.

NZTRI conducts research projects around the world and has developed strong links with Huế University in Vietnam, Wageningen University in the Netherlands, University of Akureyri in Iceland, McGill University and York University in Canada among others. Its research programme areas include coastal and marine tourism, community development, cultural heritage tourism, event tourism, health and wellness tourism, hospitality research, indigenous tourism, Pacific Islands tourism, tourism marketing, and tourism technology. The institute has a team of research officers, international interns and other allied staff.

Pacific Media Centre
The Pacific Media Centre (PMC) is located within the School of Communication Studies. It was founded in 2007 to develop media and journalism research in New Zealand, particularly involving Māori, Pacific Islands, ethnic and vernacular media topics. It is recognised as a diversity project by the Human Rights Commission (New Zealand), and has been featured by the Panos London Media Development programme for its development communication work.

The centre publishes Asia-Pacific journalism, and has published Pacific Scoop since 2009. It also publishes media and communication studies books, like the 2009 book Communication, Culture and Society in Papua New Guinea: Yo Tok Wanem?, in collaboration with other publishers or overseas universities. The center was featured as a Creative Commons case study in 2010. Founding director David Robie, a New Zealand author, journalist and media academic, won a Vice Chancellor's Award in 2011 for excellence in university teaching.

Pacific Media Watch is PMC's daily independent Asia-Pacific media monitoring service and research project. The site was launched in Sydney in October 1996, and has links with the University of the South Pacific, the University of PNG (UPNG) and the Australian Centre for Independent Journalism (ACIJ). Since moving to AUT in 2007, it has become a digital repository and received a grant from the Pacific Development and Conservation Trust in 2010 to "expand its educational and research role for the Pacific region". PMW has established a Pactok server archive, and added a D-Space archive in 2010. Representatives of Pacific Media Watch report on the region's news developments, provide advocacy for media freedom, and published a media freedom report on the South Pacific in 2011.

PMC has also published Pacific Journalism Review, a peer-reviewed research journal on media issues and communication in the South Pacific and Australia, since 2002. The journal was previously published at the University of Papua New Guinea from 1994 to 1999. The editorial policy focuses on the cultural politics of the media, including new media and social movements, the culture of indigenous peoples, the politics of tourism and development, the role of the media and the formation of national identity. It also covers environmental and development studies in the media and communication, and vernacular media in the region. In October 2010, PJR was awarded the "Creative Stimulus Award" for academic journals in the inaugural Academy Awards of the Global Creative Industries in Beijing, China. The journal has advocated free speech and freedom of information in the Asia-Pacific region.

Other research institutions
 Centre for Kode Technology Innovation (KTI, in association with Kode Biotech)
 Centre for Social Data Analytics (CSDA)
 Creative Industries Research Institute (CIRI)
 Earth and Oceanic Sciences Research Institute (EOS)
 Engineering Research and Innovation Cluster (ERIC)
 Health and Rehabilitation Research Institute (HRRI)
 Institute for Culture, Discourse and Communication (ICDC)
 Institute for Radio Astronomy and Space Research (IRASR)
 Institute of Biomedical Technologies (IBTec)
 Institute of Public Policy (IPP)
 Institute of Sport and Recreation Research
 Knowledge Engineering and Discovery Research Institute (KEDRI)
 National Institute for Public Health and Mental Health Research (NIPHMHR)
 National Institute for Stroke and Applied Neurosciences (NISAN)
 New Zealand Work and Labour Market Institute (NZWALMI)
 Te Ipukarea: National Māori Language Institute

Within these research institutes exist a large number of research centres and units. The NIPHMHR administers the Pacific Islands Families Study.

Highlights and achievements 

In the 2018 QS World University Rankings, AUT was ranked in the 441–450 band, which puts it in the top 2% of universities worldwide. The 2017 Times Higher Education (THE) World University Ranking ranked AUT as one of the top 20 universities worldwide for International Outlook, due to its high proportion of international staff, students and research partnerships. AUT was amongst the world's top 60 young universities and ranked for the first time in THE's top 150 universities under 50 years old.

AUT now features amongst the world's elite institutions in 11 subjects, featuring in the QS World University Rankings for:
 Accounting and Finance 
 Art and Design 
 Business and Management Studies 
 Computer Science and Information Systems
 Economics 
 Education
 Electrical Engineering
 Hospitality and Leisure Management
 Law
 Linguistics 
 Sports Subjects 
AUT is the first and only tertiary provider in New Zealand to be awarded the Rainbow Tick, which attests to the university's work to ensure inclusiveness for the LGBTQI community, and in positively responding to issues of gender diversity.

Notable staff

Richard Bedford (born 1945), human geographer
John Hinchcliff, inaugural vice-chancellor

Notable alumni
AUT has more than 75,000 alumni

Business and law
 Stephen Tindall – founder The Warehouse.
 Jim Anderton – politician
 Peter Williams – alpine skier.

Entertainment
 Joo Jong-hyuk - South Korean actor

Media and communications
 Carol Hirschfeld – General Manager production at Māori Television, former anchor of 3 News, former executive producer of Campbell Live.
 Pippa Wetzell – host of Fair Go, former host of Breakfast at TVNZ. 
 Charlotte Glennie – Asia correspondent for ABC.
 Duncan Garner – Radio Live drive host, former political editor at 3 News, TV3.
 Joel Defries – former presenter of Blue Peter on BBC, Select Live on C4.
 Dominic Bowden – presenter of X Factor New Zealand and former presenter of NZ Idol.

Technology
 Annette Presley – founder and CEO, Slingshot ISP.
 Bruce McLaren – race-car designer, driver, engineer and inventor.

Other
 Claire McLachlan – professor, specialist in early-childhood literacy

Student union

AUTSA (AUT Students' Association) is the students' association at AUT. Every student attending a course run by AUT is a member of AUTSA, and its primary function is to promote and maintain the rights and welfare of students. It provides advocacy and support, assignment binding, student diary and wall planner, Student Job Search, discounted phone cards, and food bank. The AUTSA Advocacy Team provide advice to students with academic grievances, grade appeals, harassment, or tenancy issues.

The AUTSA Student Representative Council (SRC) is composed of a president, a vice president, and Māori Affairs, Pasifika, Diversity, International, Disability and Postgraduate Officers. There are Business and Law, Design and Creative Technologies, Health and Environmental Sciences, Culture and Society and Te Ara Poutama Faculty Representatives. There are also City Campus, North Campus and South Campus Representatives. AUTSA representatives sit on various committees, focus groups and boards to speak out on behalf of 24,000 AUTSA members. Former presidents include April Pokino (2014–2015), Kizito Essuman (2012–2013), Veronica Ng Lam (2010–2011), Andre D'cruz (2009), and Jan Herman (2007–2008). The 2018 president is Dharyin Colbert (in 2017 it was Urshula Ansell).

AUTSA provides a fortnightly student magazine called Debate. The magazine is produced by a full-time editor and a team of student contributors. The magazine features news, views, cartoons, feature articles and columns. Debate was recognised by the Aotearoa Student Press Association Awards in 2005 "Best Small Publication" (Rebecca Williams, editor) and 2009 "Best Humourist" (Ryan Boyd, editor) and "Best Original Photography" (Clinton Cardozo, designer). AuSM also produces an annual student diary and wallplanner, and operates social media accounts.

AUTSA supports more than 40 affiliated clubs, and organises concerts, comedy shows, live DJs, dance parties, the annual Orientation Festival and other events. AUTSA sponsored the AUT Titans at the Australian University Games in 2009, winning gold in netball and touch rugby. The AUTSA lodge is based in Tongariro National Park, accommodates up to 12 people and is available to AUTSA members from $160 per night for up to 12 people. Campus venue Vesbar is owned and operated by AUTSA for its students, and operates throughout the year.

References

External links

 Auckland University of Technology

 
2000 establishments in New Zealand
Educational institutions established in 2000
Auckland CBD